Tsna or TSNA may refer to:

 Tsna (Moksha), a river in Tambov Oblast and Ryazan Oblast, tributary of the Moksha (Oka basin)
 Tsna (Tver Oblast), a river in Tver Oblast, Msta basin
 Tsna (Pripyat) a tributary of the Pripyat in Belarus
 Tsna (Oka), a river in Moscow Oblast, tributary of the Oka
 Tobacco-specific nitrosamines